Nantucket Inlet is an ice-filled inlet 6 nautical miles (11 km) wide, which recedes 13 nautical miles (24 km) in a northwest direction between the Smith Peninsula and Bowman Peninsula, along the east coast of Palmer Land, Antarctica. Discovered by members of the United States Antarctic Service (USAS) in a flight from East Base on December 30, 1940, and named for Nantucket Island, MA, home of early New England whalers of the first half of the 19th century.

[edit] Napier Ice Rise

Inlets of Palmer Land